Agroeca minuta is a species of liocranid sac spider in the family Liocranidae. It is found in the United States.

References

Liocranidae
Articles created by Qbugbot
Spiders described in 1895
Taxa named by Nathan Banks